Krum Independent School District is a public school district based in Krum, Texas (USA). Located in Krum in Denton County, the district serves approximately 1900 students.

The boundary of the school district includes Krum and portions of Denton. The school district includes sections of Denton County and Wise County.

In 2011, the school district was rated "recognized" by the Texas Education Agency.

Athletics
Until 2011 Krum was one of the few districts in Texas that did not participate in high-school football, which is extremely rare in Texas. A bond election, which would have built a football stadium, was narrowly defeated in November 2006, but was placed on the ballot again in 2007 and was passed. The 2008 school year saw Krum Middle School play the district's first ever football games (defeating the middle school B teams from powerhouse Celina in both the 7th and 8th grade contests). Krum fielded a varsity team in 2011 and played an "outlaw schedule" (i.e., not assigned to a district); the team played its first UIL-sanctioned schedule in 2012 as a member of Class AAA and finished with a 9-1 season.

Its boys basketball team has won five state championships (1971, 1978, 1994, 1996, and 1998).

Schools
Krum High School (Grades 9-12)
Krum Middle School (Grades 6-9)
Dodd Elementary School (Grades 2-5)
Dyer Elementary School (Grades 2-5)
Krum Early Education Center (Grades PK-1)

References

External links
Krum ISD

School districts in Denton County, Texas
School districts in Wise County, Texas
Denton, Texas